John Smith (born 20 November 1843 – 15 April 1873) was an English cricketer with professional status. He was associated with Cambridge Town Club and represented both the North in North v South fixtures and the Players in Gentlemen v Players fixtures. Smith was a right-handed batsman who is recorded in 75 first-class matches from 1863 to 1872, totalling 2,274 runs with a highest score of 97, one of six half-centuries, and holding 33 catches. His brother, George, was also a first-class cricketer.

References

1843 births
1873 deaths
Cambridge Town Club cricketers
English cricketers
English cricketers of 1826 to 1863
English cricketers of 1864 to 1889
North v South cricketers
Players cricketers
Left-Handed v Right-Handed cricketers
Married v Single cricketers
Marylebone Cricket Club cricketers
All-England Eleven cricketers
United North of England Eleven cricketers